Rosehill is a suburb of Auckland, in northern New Zealand. Located to the south of Pahurehure, under authority of the Auckland Council. The suburb makes up the southernmost part of the Auckland metropolitan area, and is located in the Manurewa-Papakura ward, one of the thirteen administrative divisions of Auckland city.

History

Until recently, Rosehill was not recognised as an independent suburb. The previous area was referred to as a small area of greater Papakura, but has now developed into a separate suburban area, stretching from south of Beach Road moving down to Park Estate Road, on the eastern border of the Auckland Southern Motorway and including the area to the west of Liverpool Street as well as conjoining Opaheke Road down to Graham Tagg Park inclusive.

During the major reformation of local government in 1989, the Rosehill area was included into the Papakura District boundaries.

In 2010, after a review of the Royal Commission on Auckland Governance, the entire Auckland Region was amalgamated into a single city authority. As well as the former Papakura District, all other territorial authorities were merged into a single Auckland Council. The suburb of Rosehill is part of the Manurewa-Papakura ward.

Demographics

Rosehill had a population of 4,071 at the 2018 New Zealand census, an increase of 792 people (24.2%) since the 2013 census, and an increase of 768 people (23.3%) since the 2006 census. There were 1,113 households, comprising 2,010 males and 2,058 females, giving a sex ratio of 0.98 males per female. The median age was 30.9 years (compared with 37.4 years nationally), with 999 people (24.5%) aged under 15 years, 975 (23.9%) aged 15 to 29, 1,737 (42.7%) aged 30 to 64, and 363 (8.9%) aged 65 or older.

Ethnicities were 47.8% European/Pākehā, 31.0% Māori, 17.1% Pacific peoples, 22.3% Asian, and 2.1% other ethnicities. People may identify with more than one ethnicity.

The percentage of people born overseas was 27.6, compared with 27.1% nationally.

Although some people chose not to answer the census's question about religious affiliation, 41.2% had no religion, 34.3% were Christian, 2.7% had Māori religious beliefs, 4.8% were Hindu, 1.9% were Muslim, 1.5% were Buddhist and 6.9% had other religions.

Of those at least 15 years old, 471 (15.3%) people had a bachelor's or higher degree, and 642 (20.9%) people had no formal qualifications. The median income was $31,400, compared with $31,800 nationally. 402 people (13.1%) earned over $70,000 compared to 17.2% nationally. The employment status of those at least 15 was that 1,656 (53.9%) people were employed full-time, 366 (11.9%) were part-time, and 168 (5.5%) were unemployed.

Facilities

Transport
The Auckland Southern Motorway runs off the western border of Rosehill, with the main Great South Road travelling through the centre of the suburb. Train and bus services provide the bulk of public transport in the Papakura Town Centre, just to the northwest of Rosehill.

Recreation
Rosehill has 2 skate parks, and a special education school. With a mixture or rural and urban living, the area is home to Kirk's Bush (a large forestry area), Graham Tagg Park.

Education
The school was established in 1970. Rosehill School is a school for students with special needs. The three schools are on adjoining sites.

The school opened as Papakura South School in 1954. The school teaches some classes in the Māori language.

All these schools are coeducational. Rolls are as of

References

Suburbs of Auckland